This is a list of qualifying teams for the 2014 NCAA Division I men's basketball tournament. A total of 68 teams entered the tournament. Thirty-one of the teams earned automatic bids by winning their conference tournaments, an increase of one from the prior season due to the addition of the American Athletic Conference. The automatic bid of the Ivy League, which did not conduct a postseason tournament, went to its regular season champion. The remaining 36 teams were granted at-large bids, which were extended by the NCAA Selection Committee. All teams were seeded 1 to 16 within their regionals, while the Selection Committee seeded the entire field from 1 to 68.

Qualifying teams

Automatic bids
Automatic bids to the tournament were granted for winning a conference championship tournament, except for the automatic bid of the Ivy League given to the regular season champion. Seeds listed were seeds within the conference tournaments. Runners-up in bold face were given at-large berths.

At-large bids

Listed by region and seeding 

*See First Four.

Conferences with multiple bids

Bids by state

References

NCAA Division I men's basketball tournament qualifying teams
 
qualifying teams